Freddy Ehrström (born 29 August 1925) was a Finnish sailor. He competed in the Star event at the 1960 Summer Olympics.

References

External links
 

1925 births
Possibly living people
Finnish male sailors (sport)
Olympic sailors of Finland
Sailors at the 1960 Summer Olympics – Star
Sportspeople from Helsinki